The IBM 726 was IBM's first magnetic tape unit. It was a dual magnetic tape reader/recorder developed for use with the IBM 701 and announced on May 21, 1952. This model of tape unit was shipped with the IBM 701 from December 20, 1952 until February 28, 1955. Unlike later IBM 7 track drives, the 726 could read backwards as well as forwards.

The tape had seven parallel tracks, six for data (called a copy group, not a character) and one to maintain parity. Tapes were recorded in odd parity, to ensure at least one bit transition per
copy group as well as for error checking. 

The 726 concurrently handled two reels of tape, and there were two 726 units in an IBM 701 system.

References

726
Tape 726